Kirki may refer to:

 Khadki, a town near Pune in Maharashtra, India
 Kirki (tanker), an oil tanker causing the oil spill outside of Australia on 21 July 1991
 Kirki, Republic of Dagestan, a rural locality in Dagestan, Russia
 the Andean instrument Charango
 the Indian city founded in 1610 that was renamed Aurangabad in 1653